The Lockpicker is a 2016 Canadian drama film, directed by Randall Okita. The film stars Keigian Umi Tang as Hashi, a troubled teen/petty criminal trying to escape a cycle of violence.

The film won the John Dunning Discovery Award at the 5th Canadian Screen Awards in 2017.

References

External links

2016 films
Canadian crime drama films
Films directed by Randall Okita
Canadian independent films
Canadian Film Centre films
English-language Canadian films
2010s English-language films
2010s Canadian films